Saagar may refer to:

 Saagar (film), a 1985 Bollywood film directed by Ramesh Sippy
 Saagar (album), a 2002 album by Pakistani pop band Fuzön
 Aiysha Saagar (born 1980), Australian pop singer, performer, and glamour model

See also
Sagar (disambiguation)